The following is a list of notable deaths in May 1994.

Entries for each day are listed alphabetically by surname. A typical entry lists information in the following sequence:
 Name, age, country of citizenship at birth, subsequent country of citizenship (if applicable), reason for notability, cause of death (if known), and reference.

May 1994

1
Imre Gyöngyössy, 64, Hungarian film director and screenwriter.
Yigal Mossinson, 76, Israeli novelist, playwright, and inventor.
Ayrton Senna, 34, Brazilian racing driver, racing accident.
Arnold Strippel, 82, German Nazi SS commander during World War II.

2
Nathan Adler, 83, American psychoanalyst and professor of clinical psychology.
Louis Calaferte, 65, French novelist.
Anita Durante, 96, Italian actress.
Buck Fausett, 86, American baseball player and manager.

3
Francis Bell, 50, New Zealand actor, suicide.
William Dickey, 65, American poet and professor of English, AIDS-related complications.
Vladimir Kostine, 72, Russian basketball referee.
Felipe Galarza Sánchez, 81, Spanish military officer.

4
Andrey Abramov, 58, Soviet/Russian boxer.
Per Engdahl, 85, Swedish far-right politician.
Roger Jenkins, 82, American-Canadian ice hockey player.
Kōtō Matsudaira, 91, Japanese diplomat.
Josip Palada, 82, Yugoslavian tennis player.

5
Egan Chambers, 73, Canadian politician.
Joe Layton, 63, American director and choreographer.
Harry O'Boyle, 89, American gridiron football player.
Mário Quintana, 87, Brazilian writer and translator.
Louise Troy, 60, American actress of stage and screen, breast cancer.
Noel Wimalasena, 80, Sri Lankan lawyer and politician.

6
Rafael Baledón, 74, Mexican film actor, director, screenwriter, and producer.
Murray Boltinoff, 83, American writer and editor of comic books.
John Henry Bremridge, 67, Hong Kong politician.
Mkhitar Djrbashian, 75, Armenian mathematician.
Malvina Pastorino, 77, Argentine film actress, fall.
Moses Rosen, 81, Romanian rabbi.
Fred Sadoff, 67, American actor, AIDS-related complications.
Antal Szendey, 79, Hungarian rower and Olympian.

7
Haim Bar-Lev, 69, Israeli general and politician, cancer.
Clement Greenberg, 85, American essayist and visual art critic.
John Thomas Howell, 90, American botanist and taxonomist.
Mpinga Kasenda, 56, Prime Minister of Zaire under Mobutu Sese Seko, accident.
Pahor Labib, 88, Egyptian egyptologist and coptologist.
Andy McEvoy, 55, Irish football player.
Chuck Taylor, 74, American football player and coach.
Aharon Yariv, 73, Israeli politician and general.

8
Edith Bullock, 91, American businesswoman and politician.
Einar Diesen, 96, Norwegian journalist and newspaper editor.
Jim Finks, 66, American football player, coach, and executive, lung cancer.
Steven Keats, 49, American actor (Death Wish, Black Sunday, Silent Rage), suicide.
George Peppard, 65, American actor (Breakfast at Tiffany's, The A-Team, The Carpetbaggers), lung cancer.
Murray Spivack, 90, Russian-American sound engineer.

9
Anni Albers, 94, American textile artist and printmaker.
Ralph Brickner, 69, American Major League Baseball player.
Allan Frost Archer, 86, American entomologist and arachnologist.
Bengt Lehander, 68, Swedish Air Force officer.
Heinz-Werner Meyer, 61, German trade union leader and politician.

10
Cleanth Brooks, 87, American literary critic and professor.
John Wayne Gacy Jr., 52, American serial killer and sex offender, execution by lethal injection.
Lucebert, 69, Dutch poet and painter.
Elias Motsoaledi, 69, South African anti-apartheid activist.
Lil Picard, 94, German-American actress, artist, and journalist.

11
Alfred James Broomhall, 82, British missionary in China and author.
Timothy Carey, 65, American actor (The Killing, Paths of Glory, One-Eyed Jacks), stroke.
Nikolay Fyodorov, 80, Soviet-Russian animator, director, writer and cartoonist.
Henri Guisol, 89, French film actor.
Lloyd Hughes, 81, Australian politician.
Helmut Käser, 81, Swiss lawyer and general secretary of FIFA.
Romano Puppo, 61, Italian stuntman and actor, traffic collision.
Bennie Warren, 82, American Major League Baseball player.

12
Xen Balaskas, 83, South African cricket player.
Sir Alfred Beit, 2nd Baronet, 91, British politician, art collector and philanthropist.
Catherine Berndt, 76, Australian anthropologist.
Paul Cushing Child, 92, American civil servant, diplomat, and artist.
Erik Erikson, 91, Danish-German-American psychologist and psychoanalyst.
Si Johnson, 87, American baseball player.
Roy J. Plunkett, 83, American chemist, cancer.
John Smith, 55, Scottish politician, heart attack.
André Zwobada, 84, French screenwriter, producer and film director.

13
Vladimir Antoshin, 64, Soviet/Russian chess Grandmaster.
Duncan Hamilton, 74, British racing driver.
John Francis Kennedy, 88, American politician.
John Swainson, 68, Canadian-American politician and jurist.

14
Dave Albritton, 81, American high jumper, and coach, and politician.
Cihat Arman, 78, Turkish football goalkeeper and manager.
W. Graham Claytor, Jr., 82, American Navy officer, attorney, and government official.
Burt Monroe, 63, American ornithologist.
Brian Roper, 64, British-American actor, and real estate agent.
Olga Spiridonović, 70, Serbian actress.
Leonard Teale, 71, Australian actor, radio announcer, and presenter.
Robert G. Vosper, 80, American educator and librarian.

Gacy

15
Omprakesh Agrawal, 39, Indian snooker player, cancer.
Leonard Carpenter, 91, American rower and Olympian.
Royal Dano, 71, American actor (The Outlaw Josey Wales, Killer Klowns from Outer Space, The Right Stuff), heart attack.
Oskar Heil, 86, German electrical engineer and inventor.
Sherman Landers, 96, American track and field athlete and Olympian.
Alexander Nove, 78, British professor of Economics.
Gilbert Roland, 88, Mexican-American actor, cancer.
Robert T. Secrest, 90, American politician.

16
Val A. Browning, 98, American gunmaker and philanthropist.
Alain Cuny, 85, French actor in theatre and cinema.
Dalmiro Finol, 74, Venezuelan baseball player.
Zdeňka Honsová, 66, Czech gymnast and Olympian.
Phani Majumdar, 82, Indian film director.
Roy McElroy, 87, New Zealand lawyer and politician.
Alfred Otto Carl Nier, 82, American physicist.
Gerardo Reichel-Dolmatoff, 82, Austrian anthropologist and archaeologist.
Paul Shulman, 72, Israeli Navy officer.

17
Gérson da Silva, 28, Brazilian football player, AIDS-related complications.
Nicolás Gómez Dávila, 80, Colombian philosopher, cardiovascular disease.
Leonila Garcia, 87, Filipino pharmacist.
Irène Hamoir, 87, Belgian novelist and poet.
Étienne Hirsch, 93, French civil engineer and member of the French Resistance during World War II.
Vladimír Podzimek, 29, Czechoslovakian ski jumper and Olympian, suicide.
John Thanos, 45, American convicted murderer, execution by lethal injection.

18
Harry Barker, 95, New Zealand newspaper journalist and editor.
John Cramer, 98, Australian politician, heart attack.
Manuel Manahan, 78, Filipino politician, journalist, and businessman.
Mamintal A.J. Tamano, 65, Filipino politician statesman.

19
Joseph Chatt, 79, British chemist.
Jacques Ellul, 82, French philosopher and sociologist.
Henry Morgan, 79, American humorist, lung cancer.
Luis Ocaña, 48, Spanish road bicycle racer, suicide.
Jacqueline Kennedy Onassis, 64, American socialite, writer, and First Lady of the United States, non-Hodgkin lymphoma.

20
Bartine Burkett, 96, American film actress, heart attack.
Fernande Giroux, Canadian actress and jazz singer.
Ingrid Hafner, 57, British actress, ALS.
Kasu Brahmananda Reddy, 84, Indian politician.
Jiří Sobotka, 82, Czechoslovak football player.

21
Martin Doherty, 35, Irish republican and IRA volunteer, shot.
Giovanni Goria, 50, Italian politician, lung cancer.
David S. Holmes Jr., 79, American politician.
Masayoshi Ito, 80, Japanese politician.
Norman Low, 80, Scottish football player and manager.
Ralph Miliband, 70, British sociologist, heart attack.
Johan Hendrik Weidner, 81, Dutch member of the resistance during World War II.
Cliff Wilson, 60, Welsh snooker player.

22
Jane Dulo, 75, American actress and comedian.
Gerhard Krüger, 85, German Nazi Party student leader and later a neo-Nazi figure.
Mitacq, 66, Belgian comics author.
Norman Read, 62, New Zealand racewalker and Olympian, heart attack.

23
Al Baldwin, 71, American gridiron football player.
Ray Candy, 42, American professional wrestler, heart attack.
George de Godzinsky, 79, Russian-Finnish composer and conductor.
Olav Hauge, 85, Norwegian horticulturist, translator and poet.
Leo Kuper, 89, South African sociologist.
George Metesky, 90, American electrician and mechanic.
Joe Pass, 65, American jazz guitarist, liver cancer.
Oscar Saul, 81, American screenwriter.
Joan Vickers, Baroness Vickers, 86, British politician.

24
Martin Goldsmith, 80, American screenwriter and novelist.
Julien Hébert, 76, Québécois industrial designer.
Bill Schutte, 84, American football player and coach.
John Wain, 69, English poet, novelist, and critic.

25
Joe Brainard, 52, American artist and writer, AIDS-related complications.
Willi Eichhorn, 85, German rower and Olympian.
Eric Gale, 55, American jazz and R&B guitarist, lung cancer.
John Mackie, Baron John-Mackie, 84, British politician.
Robert Paverick, 81, Belgian football player.

26
Károly Antal, 84, Hungarian sculptor.
George Ball, 84, American diplomat and banker.
Muriel Cooper, 69, American book designer, digital designer, and researcher.
Shelby Cullom Davis, 85, American businessman, investor, and philanthropist.
Mayeum Choying Wangmo Dorji, 97, Bhutanese royal and politician.
Gil Fuller, 74, American jazz arranger, composer and bandleader.
André Gérard, 83, French football player and manager.
Jules Keignaert, 86, French water polo player and politician.
Hezy Leskly, 41, Israeli poet, choreographer, painter and art critic, AIDS-related complications.
Pug Lund, 81, American gridiron football player.
Norberto Menéndez, 57, Argentine football player.
Sonny Sharrock, 53, American jazz guitarist, heart attack.
Robbie Stanley, 26, American auto racing driver, racing accident.
Red Treadway, 74, American baseball player.

27
Klaus Beckmann, 49, German politician.
Charles Rodman Campbell, 39, American convicted murderer, execution by hanging.
Luis de Carlos, 87, Spanish football executive.
Lakshman Shastri Joshi, 93, Indian writer, scholar, and literary critic.
George Melinkovich, 82, American football player and coach.
Red Rodney, 66, American jazz trumpeter, lung cancer.
Art Spinney, 66, American football player.

28
Julius Boros, 74, American golfer, heart attack.
James Burke, 67, American prelate of the Catholic Church.
Daniel Flood, 90, American attorney and politician.
Zainulabedin Gulamhusain Rangoonwala, 80, Indian activist and banker.
Hugh Stirling, 86, Canadian football player.
Max Walter Svanberg, 82, Swedish painter, illustrator, and designer.
Branislav Varsik, 90, Slovak historian and archivist.

29
José Bohr, 92, German-Chilean film director, producer, actor and screenwriter.
Peter Cranmer, 79, English sportsman.
Raymond Fellay, 62, Swiss alpine skier and Olympian.
Erich Honecker, 81, German communist politician and leader of the GDR, liver cancer.
Oliver Jackson, 61, American jazz drummer, heart failure.
Joseph Janni, 78, British film producer.
Harry Levin, 81, American literary critic and scholar.
Áskell Löve, 77, Icelandic botanist.
Lady May Abel Smith, 88, British noblewoman.

30
Ezra Taft Benson, 94, American farmer, government official, and religious leader, heart failure.
Marcel Bich, 79, Italian-French industrialist and co-founder of Bic.
Agostino Di Bartolomei, 39, Italian football player, suicide.
Donald Hill, 71, British engineer and historian of science and technology.
Jack Krol, 57, American baseball coach and manager, cancer.
Juan Carlos Onetti, 84, Uruguayan novelist and author of short stories, heart attack.
Juzo Sanada, 71, Japanese baseball player.
Pavle Savić, 85, Serbian physicist and chemist.
István Tamássy, 83, Hungarian football player.

31
Frank Beck, 51, English convicted child sex offender, heart attack.
Mbaye Diagne, 36, Senegalese military officer, killed in action.
Sidney Gilliat, 86, English film director, producer and writer.
Manny Klein, 86, American jazz trumpeter.
Herva Nelli, 85, Italian-American operatic soprano, leukemia.
Samta Prasad, 72, Indian classical musician and tabla player.
Henri Woode, 84, American composer, lyricist, arranger, and singer.
Hannah Marie Wormington, 79, American archaeologist.

References 

1994-05
 05